Willie Harmon, (born April 20, 1899), was an American boxer in the welterweight division.  Harmon was a top welterweight contender for a number of years in the mid-1920s. He was ranked as the #6 welterweight in the world for 1925 by The Ring magazine.

Early life and career
Harmon was born on April 20, 1899 to Jewish parents in New York's Lower East Side.

He defeated Pinky Mitchell, former Junior Welterweight world champion, on August 14, 1925 in a ten round points decision in Milwaukee.  A few publications listed the bout as a draw. The event was made memorable by Mitchell returning his purse, claiming he fought too poorly to have earned it.

Nate Goldman, fellow Jewish boxer, became a second round knockout victim at Madison Square Garden on New Year's day 1926.  Goldman was actually knocked out in the first round, but the count was interrupted by the bell.  The full count was made in the second.

He lost to Joe Dundee on May 28, 1926 in a ten round points decision in Brooklyn.  Due to the contestants' mutual respect for the other's gifts, the bout was slow and fought cautiously with frequent clinching.

Contending for the World Welterweight title, June, 1926

On June 29, 1926, he challenged champion Pete Latzo for the world welterweight title. The fight took place outdoors in Dreamland Park, in Newark, New Jersey. While Harmon weighed in at 144.5 lbs, Latzo weighed in at 153 lbs—6 lbs over the 147-lb welterweight limit. 
Although Harmon fought valiantly, and won the earlier rounds, he was knocked cold by the champion in the fifth round, and lay unconscious for several minutes.  A thundering right by Latzo scored the final knockout.

On January 14, 1927, he beat Myer Cohen in a seventh round technical knockout at Madison Square Garden.

He drew with Texan Tommy White in ten rounds on April 5, 1927 at Madison Square Garden. Harmon took an advantage in the first few rounds, but White countered in the bout's mid rounds.  The final rounds were fought more aggressively as both boxers tried to gain an edge in points.

He won a ten round newspaper decision against Billy Alger on July 20, 1927 in Newark, New Jersey, though several newspapers reported the bout as a draw.

He lost to Vince Dundee, future World Middleweight champion, in a ten round decision on August 1, 1927 in Baltimore.  The bout was fought with great caution by both boxers, and the crowd yelled accusations of "fake" in the late rounds.  Many ringside, including the reporter for the Baltimore Sun, felt Harmon, not Dundee, deserved the decision.

References

External links
 

1899 births

Jewish boxers
Welterweight boxers
Year of death missing
Place of birth missing
Jewish American boxers
Boxers from New York (state)
American male boxers